Deacon Andrew Hetfield House, also known as the Hetfield House or the Dutch Oven House, is a historical house in Mountainside, Union County, New Jersey, United States. It was built around 1763 by Deacon Andrew Hetfield, who was a Presbyterian deacon in Westfield. The Hetfield House was nicknamed "the Dutch Oven House" during its stint as an antique store during the 1930s-1980s.

The house has been moved twice: once to shift it 50 feet back when they were widening the nearby highway, and a second relocation in 1985 to save it from bulldozing. Reportedly, the house suffered minimal structural damage from the second move (one windowpane was lost).

The Hetfield House has been expanded over the years; as of 1830, the simple colonial farmhouse had been transformed “into a center-hall Georgian residence” (New Jersey Historical Commission, p. 24).

References
Footnotes

Citations
Conklin, J. (2011). New Providence Daily Photo. "Hetfield House".
McNamara, C. (2010). A History of Mountainside, 1945-2007: It Was Only Yesterday. The History Press: Charleston, SC. .
New Jersey Historical Commission. (2011). Four Centuries in a Weekend. “10. Mountainside: Deacon Andrew Hetfield House, Constitution Plaza.” (pamphlet).

Houses completed in 1763
Houses in Union County, New Jersey
Georgian architecture in New Jersey
Houses on the National Register of Historic Places in New Jersey
National Register of Historic Places in Union County, New Jersey
New Jersey Register of Historic Places
Mountainside, New Jersey